Antonians Sports Club is a first-class cricket team in Sri Lanka. It played first-class cricket from 1992–93 to 2002–03, and again in 2010–11.

List of players

See also
 List of Sri Lankan cricket teams

References

External links
 Antonians Sports Club at CricketArchive
 Antonians Sports Club at CricInfo

Former senior cricket clubs of Sri Lanka